Cuterebra, or rodent bots, is a genus of bot flies that attack rodents and similar animals.

Etymology
The genus name Cuterebra is a blend of the Latin words cutis : skin and terebra : borer with apparent shortening of expected Cutiterebra to Cuterebra.

Species
These 78 species belong to the genus Cuterebra:

 Cuterebra abdominalis Swenk, 1905 i c g b
 Cuterebra albata Sabrosky, 1986 i c g
 Cuterebra albipilosa Sabrosky, 1986 i c g b
 Cuterebra almeidai (Guimaraes & Carrera, 1941) c g
 Cuterebra americana (Fabricius, 1775) i c g b (woodrat bot fly)
 Cuterebra apicalis Guérin-Méneville, 1835 c g
 Cuterebra approximata Walker, 1866 i c g b
 Cuterebra arizonae Sabrosky, 1986 i c g b
 Cuterebra atrox Clark i c g b
 Cuterebra austeni Sabrosky, 1986 i c g b
 Cuterebra baeri Shannon & Greene, 1926 c g
 Cuterebra bajensis Sabrosky, 1986 i c g b
 Cuterebra buccata (Fabricius, 1776) i c g b (rabbit bot fly)
 Cuterebra bureni Dalmat, 1942 c g
 Cuterebra cayennensis Macquart, 1843 c g
 Cuterebra clarki Sabrosky, 1986 i c g
 Cuterebra cochisei Sabrosky, 1986 i c g b
 Cuterebra cometes Shannon & Ponte, 1926
 Cuterebra conflans Bau, 1929
 Cuterebra cuniculi (Clark, 1797) i c g b
 Cuterebra dasypoda Brauer, 1896 c g
 Cuterebra detrudator Clark, 1848 c g
 Cuterebra dorsalis Bau, 1929
 Cuterebra emasculator Fitch, 1856 i c g b (squirrel bot fly)
 Cuterebra enderleini Bau, 1929 i c g
 Cuterebra ephippium Latreille, 1818 c g
 Cuterebra fasciata Swenk, 1905 i c g
 Cuterebra fassleri Guimaraes, 1984 c g
 Cuterebra flaviventris (Bau, 1931) c g
 Cuterebra fontinella Clark, 1827 i c g b (mouse bot fly)
 Cuterebra funebris (Austen, 1895) c g
 Cuterebra gilvopilosa Bau, 1932 c g
 Cuterebra grandis (Guérin-Méneville, 1844) c g
 Cuterebra grisea Coquillett, 1904 i c g
 Cuterebra histrio Coquillett, 1902 c g
 Cuterebra indistincta Sabrosky, 1986 i c g
 Cuterebra infulata Lutz, 1917 c g
 Cuterebra jellisoni Curran, 1942 i c g b
 Cuterebra latifrons Coquillett, 1898 i c g b
 Cuterebra lepida Austen, 1933
 Cuterebra lepivora Coquillett, 1898 i c g b
 Cuterebra lepusculi Townsend, 1897 i c g b (cottontail rabbit botfly)
 Cuterebra lopesi Guimaraes, 1990 c g
 Cuterebra lutzi Bau, 1930 c g
 Cuterebra maculosa Knab, 1914 c g
 Cuterebra megastoma Brauer, 1863 c g
 Cuterebra mirabilis Sabrosky, 1986 i c g b
 Cuterebra neomexicana Sabrosky, 1986 i c g b
 Cuterebra nigricans Lutz, 1917
 Cuterebra obscuriventris Sabrosky, 1986 i c g
 Cuterebra ornata Bau, 1928 c g
 Cuterebra patagona Guérin-Méneville, 1844 c g
 Cuterebra pessoai Guimaraes & Carrera, 1941 c g
 Cuterebra polita Coquillett, 1898 i c g b
 Cuterebra postica Sabrosky, 1986 c g
 Cuterebra praegrandis Austen, 1933 c g
 Cuterebra princeps (Austen, 1895) i c g
 Cuterebra pulchra Bau, 1930
 Cuterebra pusilla Bau, 1931
 Cuterebra pygmae Bau, 1931
 Cuterebra rubiginosa Bau, 1931
 Cuterebra ruficrus (Austen, 1933) i c g b
 Cuterebra rufiventris Macquart, 1843 c g
 Cuterebra sabroskyi Guimaraes, 1984 c g
 Cuterebra sarcophagoides Lutz, 1917
 Cuterebra schmalzi Lutz, 1917
 Cuterebra semiatra (Wiedemann, 1830) c g
 Cuterebra semilutea Bau, 1929 c g
 Cuterebra simulans Austen, 1933 c g
 Cuterebra sterilator Lugger, 1897 i c g
 Cuterebra sternopleuralis Sabrosky, 1986 i c g
 Cuterebra sternpleuralis Sabrosky, 1986
 Cuterebra tenebriformis Sabrosky, 1986 i c g
 Cuterebra tenebrosa Coquillett, 1898 i c g b (rodent bot fly)
 Cuterebra terrisona Walker, 1849 c g
 Cuterebra townsendi (Fonseca, 1941) c g
 Cuterebra trigonophora Brauer, 1863 c g
 Cuterebra worontzowi Guimaraes & Carrera, 1941

Data sources: i = ITIS, c = Catalogue of Life, g = GBIF, b = Bugguide.net

See also 
 Cuterebriasis

References

External links 
 

Oestridae
Parasitic flies
Parasites of rodents
Oestroidea genera